Ahmedabad Metro is a rapid transit system for the cities of Ahmedabad and Gandhinagar in Gujarat state of India.

The construction started on 14 March 2015. A  section of East–West corridor was inaugurated on 4 March 2019 and was opened to the public on 6 March 2019. The rest of the Phase–1 was inaugurated on 30 September 2022 and opened to public on 2 and 6 October 2022.
The stations of Kankaria East, Sabarmati Railway Station and Thaltej Gam are not yet ready. When travelling underground, there is an announcement in the train that says the next station will be skipped. The tracks from Thaltej station to Thaltej Gam station are not yet ready. The announcements in train are in Gujarati, Hindi and English. The duration between two trains is 30 minutes.

The branch line connecting to GIFT City is expected to open in early 2024.

History

In 2003, Gujarat Infrastructure Development Board carried out the study for urban transport between Gandhinagar and Ahmedabad. It also carried out the detailed project report through Delhi Metro Rail Corporation and RITES and submitted it in June 2005 and received Central Government's approval in the same year. In 2008, considering the future developments in and around Ahmedabad and Gandhinagar, the project was revived and new corridors were designed to make the project viable.

Later in 2014, it was decided that the Central Government will own 50% of the company.

Phase-1 

On 19 October 2014, Union Cabinet of India approved  for the Phase–1. The Central Government approved the use of unused Western Railways land along the Botad-Sabarmati meter gauge line in November 2014. The original plan of Metro along Ashram Road was tweaked and the track was moved westward. It helped by fewer problems in land acquisition and less congestion on Ashram Road. In 2015 budget of Gujarat,  was further allocated for the metro. The ground-breaking ceremony for North-South Corridor was held on 17 January 2016 in presence of the then Gujarat CM Anandiben Patel. The work started in March 2016. The Indian Railways permitted the construction of North–South corridor stretch on its land in June 2016.

The section was inaugurated on 4 March 2019 by Indian Prime Minister Narendra Modi. It opened to the public on 6 March 2019. The -long Thaltej-Thaltej Gam section and three metro stations will be completed by January-March 2023. The rest of the Phase-1 was inaugurated on 30 September 2022 by Prime Minister Modi. The east–west corridor and the north–south corridor will be opened to public on 2 October 2022 and 6 October 2022 respectively.

Phase-2 
The Government of Gujarat approved the Phase-2 in October 2017 and revised it in October 2018. It will extend the north–south corridor from Motera in Ahmedabad to Mahatma Mandir in Gandhinagar with a branch line from Gujarat National Law University (GNLU) linking Pandit Deendayal Energy University (PDEU) and GIFT City. The Phase-2 will have total -long elevated corridor with 22 stations.

The tendering for the Phase 2 began in January 2020. On 18 January 2021, the foundation stone of the Phase-2 was laid by Prime Minister Modi. The branch line connecting to GIFT City is expected to open in early 2024.

Systems

Operational Systems

Network information 

Note: East-West Corridor is  elevated and  underground.

Current status

Operations 
The metro started commercial operations in March 2019. Over 7.1 lakh people had travelled by metro till June 2022 but the monthly ridership had never exceeded 38,137 which is the highest ridership registered in March 2019 due to short length of the opened corridor then. The most riders were identified as those taking joyrides.

Following opening of the Phase-1 in September 2022, the ridership increased significantly.Read more.

Construction

Construction contracts

Controversy
Near Thaltej Gam on western side, 300-odd shop owners opposed the land acquisition while the officials said that there is need of huge land for depot and parking for the project. The land acquisition is also opposed by the residents and shop owners of Jivraj Park in Vejalpur area. They had filed a case in Gujarat High Court. They settled the case in September 2017. Another case regarding procurement of 603 tons of TMT steel worth  which was never delivered is also being investigated.

Network map

See also
Urban rail transit in India
List of Ahmedabad Metro stations
East-West Corridor
North-South Corridor
Surat Metro
Ahmedabad Bus Rapid Transit System

References

External links

 Official website
 Phase-1 Detailed Project Report

 
Transport in Ahmedabad
Rail transport in Gujarat
Transport in Gandhinagar
Standard gauge railways in India
2019 establishments in Gujarat